The 9th Standing Committee of the Supreme People's Assembly (SPA) was elected by the 1st Session of the 9th Supreme People's Assembly on 26 May 1990. It was replaced on 6 September 1998 by the 10th SPA Presidium.

Officers

Chairman

Vice Chairman

Secretary

Members

References

Citations

Bibliography
Books:
 

9th Supreme People's Assembly
Presidium of the Supreme People's Assembly
1990 establishments in North Korea
1998 disestablishments in North Korea